Carrão is an administrative district of the São Paulo, with 75,000 residents as of 2005. It belongs to the Aricanduva sub-prefecture.

Carrão is located about 13 km east of the city's center. It is named after João José da Silva Carrão, a prominent public figure who owned most of the district's area at the end of the 19th century.

History

Colonial period
In the 16th century, the area of the present district was crossed by the trail connecting the Indian villages of Piratininga and Biacica or Imbiacica (now Itaim Paulista, Vila Curuçá and part of Jardim Helena). That trail was also used by the early colonial explorers (bandeirantes). Some historians claim that the lands were part of the domain (sesmaria) granted by the Portuguese Crown to João Ramalho. One of the first permanent residents was in fact the explorer Francisco Velho, who settled along the Aricanduva, on land belonging to Brás Cubas.

Imperial period
Over the following centuries the region became occupied by large farms. The most famous was a property formerly called Tucuri or Bom Retiro, which was acquired in 1865 by Councillor Carrão and then became known as Chácara Carrão.

Around the turn of the 20th century, immigrant workers from Portugal, Italy, Spain, and later from Japan came to the area to work at Carrão's farm and at a wool mill, the Lanifícios Minerva S/A, built there in 1906 by Belgian entrepreneurs Paschoal Boronheid and Fernand Delcroix..  An urbanized borough,  Vila Carrão, was established in 1917. Another major factor in the area's development was the installation in the 1930s of a large cotton mill, the Cotonifício Guilherme Giorgi, which at its height employed 2800 workers. The remaining lands of Chácara carrão were urbanized and became the boroughs of Vila Nova Manchester (1922), Vila Santa Isabel (1931), and Jardim Têxtil.

Promotion to district
By the 1950s the area which is now the Carrão district was almost entirely urbanized and integrated with the São Paulo urban area.

The Carrão district was created in 1991 by an act of then mayor Luiza Erundina. Until then, the land was part of the Tatuapé district.  It comprises the following neighborhoods: Carrãozinho, Chácara Santo Antonio, Chácara Califórnia, Vila Carrão, Vila Nova Manchester, Vila Santa Isabel, and Vila São Vicente.

The new district boundaries deviated somewhat from the historical borough boundaries.  In particular, the Carrão metro station, until then part of the Vila Carrão borough, is now in the Tatupé district.

Curiosities
Carrão and the neighboring district of Vila Formosa share the Vila Formosa Cemetery (est. 1949). It is believed to be the largest cemetery in Latin America, with 780,000 m2 and more than 1,400,000 "permanent residents".

See also
 Roman Catholic Archdiocese of São Paulo

External links
Articles on the History of São Paulo Boroughs by the Revista IN Online (in Portuguese). Accessed 2009-06-22.
Vila Carrão commemorates its 88th anniversary (September 16, 2005), a page by the São Paulo Mayor's Office.
Article on Vila Carrão (2004) from RevistaIN (in Portuguese)
Another one (2003).
And another (2001)

References

Levino Ponciano (2004), São Paulo: 450 bairros, 450 anos. SENAC. 362 pages. , 

Districts of São Paulo